Marko Ristić may refer to:
Marko Ristić (surrealist) (1902–1984), Serbian surrealist poet
Marko Ristić (footballer, born 1987), Serbian association football player
Marko Ristić (footballer, born 1997), Serbian association football player